Calaboose is a 1943 American Western film directed by Hal Roach Jr. It stars Jimmy Rogers, Mary Brian and Noah Beery Jr.

It is a sequel to Dudes are Pretty People (1942), a featurette from "Hal Roach's Streamliners" which is a series of approximately 50-minute comedic movies. The film runs 45 minutes. Another sequel followed later the same year, with Rogers and Beery playing the same characters, entitled Prairie Chickens.

Cast
 Jimmy Rogers as Jim
 Noah Beery Jr. as Pidge Crosby
 Mary Brian as Doris Lane
 William Henry as Tom Pendergrast (billed as Bill Henry)
 Paul Hurst as Bartender Ed
 Marc Lawrence as Sluggsy Baker
 William B. Davidson as Sheriff George Lane (billed as William Davidson)
 Jean Porter as Major Barbara
 Iris Adrian as Gert

External links

References

1943 films
1943 Western (genre) films
American black-and-white films
American Western (genre) films
American sequel films
1940s English-language films
1940s American films